is a prefecture of Japan located in the Chūgoku region of Honshu. Yamaguchi Prefecture has a population of 1,377,631 (1 February 2018) and has a geographic area of 6,112 km2 (2,359 sq mi). Yamaguchi Prefecture borders Shimane Prefecture to the north and Hiroshima Prefecture to the northeast.

Yamaguchi is the capital and Shimonoseki is the largest city of Yamaguchi Prefecture, with other major cities including Ube, Shūnan, and Iwakuni. Yamaguchi Prefecture is located at the western tip of Honshu with coastlines on the Sea of Japan and Seto Inland Sea, and separated from the island of Kyushu by the Kanmon Straits.

History 

Yamaguchi Prefecture was created by the merger of the provinces of Suō and Nagato. During the rise of the samurai class during the Heian and Kamakura Periods (794–1333), the Ouchi family of Suō Province and the Koto family of Nagato Province gained influence as powerful warrior clans. In the Muromachi period (1336—1573), Ouchi Hiroyo, the 24th ruler of the Ouchi family conquered both areas of Yamaguchi Prefecture. The Ouchi clan imitated the city planning of Kyoto. They gained great wealth through cultural imports from the continent and trade with Korea and Ming Dynasty China. As a result, Yamaguchi came to be known as the "Kyoto of the West," and Ouchi culture flourished. Sue Harutaka defeated the 31st ruler of the Ouchi clan. The Sue clan was then defeated by Mōri Motonari, and the Mōri family gained control of the Chūgoku region. Yamaguchi was ruled as part of the Mōri clan domain during the Sengoku period. Mōri Terumoto was then defeated by Tokugawa Ieyasu in the battle of Sekigahara in 1600. He was forced to give up all his land except for the Suō and Nagato areas (current-day Yamaguchi Prefecture), where he built his castle in Hagi. Mōri sought to strengthen the economic base of the region and increase local production with his Three Whites campaign (salt, rice, and paper).

After Commodore Matthew Perry's opening of Japan, clans from Nagato (also called Chōshū) played a key role in the fall of the Tokugawa shogunate and the establishment of the new imperial government.
Four years after the Edo Shogunate was overthrown and the Meiji government formed in 1868, the present Yamaguchi Prefecture was established. The Meiji government brought in many new systems and modern policies, and promoted the introduction of modern industry, though the prefecture was still centered on agriculture during this period. In the Taishō period, from 1912 to 1926, shipbuilding, chemical, machinery, and metal working plants were built in Yamaguchi's harbors in the Seto Inland Sea area. During the post-World War II Shōwa Period, Yamaguchi developed into one of the most industrialized prefectures in the country due to the establishment of petrochemical complexes.

Geography 
As of April 1, 2012, 7% of the total land area of the prefecture was designated as Natural Parks, namely the Setonaikai National Park; Akiyoshidai, Kita-Nagato Kaigan, and Nishi-Chūgoku Sanchi Quasi-National Parks; and Chōmonkyō, Iwakiyama, Rakanzan, and Toyota Prefectural Natural Parks.

Current municipalities

Mergers

Economic development
For the purposes of development analysis, Yamaguchi is construed to be part of Northern Kyushu. Although Yamaguchi is not part of the island of Kyushu, it has become a functional satellite of the Kanmon Straits metropolitan area.

Demographics

Per Japanese census data, Yamaguchi prefecture has had negative population growth from 1955 to 1973 and 1985–onwards

Tourism 
The most popular place for tourism is Shimonoseki, which has the Karato Fish Market and a large fireworks festival in summer.

Another attraction is the Kintai Bridge in the town of Iwakuni. This five-arched wooden structure is considered a symbol of Western Honshū. The area on the banks of the Nishiki river close to the bridge is considered among the best places in Japan for Hanami, when groups of family and friends gather in early April to view cherry blossoms.

Hagi City is in the north of Yamaguchi. It is a very traditional city. The usual color of Japanese post boxes is red, but in Hagi they are painted green or brown. The Hagi Museum is modeled after a traditional samurai residence. The exhibits are detailed and realistic, and are changed every year. The permanent collection is data about Hagi's history and collections about Takasugi Shinsaku. Hagi also contains a reverberatory furnace which has been designated a World Heritage Site.

Kawara soba (hot tile noodles) is a popular dish in Yamaguchi. It was developed during the Seinan Rebellion when soldiers cooked wild grass and meat on hot tiles. Today people in Yamaguchi create this dish by frying green tea noodles on a hot tile, and arranging a thin fried egg, stewed beef, green onions, and grilled liver on top. 

Famous festivals and events 
 Kintaikyo Festival in Iwakuni - held on April 29
 Nishiki River Water Festival in Iwakuni - held in August
 Iwakuni Festival in August
 Yokomichi Festival, Kintai Bridge November 19
 Yanai Goldfish Lantern Festival in August
 Yamaguchi Gion Festival on July 20 to 27
 Yamaguchi Tanabata Lantern Festival on August 6 to 7
 Hagi Era Festival in April
 Hagi Festival on August 2 to 3
 Shimonoseki Strait Festival on May 2 to 4
 Shimonoseki Firework Festival in August

Education

High schools

Universities 
 Baiko Gakuin University (private)
 National Fisheries University (national)
 Shimonoseki City University (public)
 Tokyo University of Science, Yamaguchi (public)
 Ube Frontier University (private)
 University of East Asia (private)
 Yamaguchi Gakugei College (private)
 Yamaguchi Prefectural University (public)
 Yamaguchi University (national)
 Yamaguchi University of Human Welfare and Culture (private)

Transportation

Ferries from Shimonoseki Port International Terminal
Two ferry services provide regular sea transport from the Shimonoseki Port International Terminal: Kanpu Ferry provides round-trip service to Busan, South Korea; the Orient Ferry provides round-trip service to Qingdao and Shanghai, respectively.

Kanpu ferry to Pusan in South Korea regularly
Gwangyang Beech to Gwangyang in South Korea regularly
Orient ferry to Qingdao in China regularly
Orient ferry to Shanghai in China regularly

Other ferry routes
 Shunan-Kunisaki, Kyushu
 Yanai-Matsuyama, Shikoku

Air
 Yamaguchi Ube Airport (to Haneda Airport (Tokyo))
 Iwakuni Kintaikyo Airport (to Haneda Airport (Tokyo) and Naha Airport (Okinawa))

Railway
West Japan Railway Company
Sanyō Shinkansen
San'yō Main Line
Sanin Line
Yamaguchi Line
Gantoku Line
Onoda Line
Mine Line
Ube Line
Nishikigawa Railway

Roads

Expressways
Sanyo Expressway
Chūgoku Expressway

Toll roads
 Hagi Misumi Road
 Kanmon Bridge
 Yamaguchi Ube Onoda Road
 Ogori Hagi Road
 Kanmon Road Tunnel

National highways
 Route 2
 Route 9
 Route 187 (Iwakuni-Tsuwano-Masuda)
 Route 188 (Iwakuni-Yanai-Hikari-Kudamatsu)
 Route 189
 Route 190
 Route 191
 Route 262
 Route 315 (Shunan-Hagi)
 Route 316
 Route 376 (Yamaguchi-Shunan-Iwakuni)
 Route 434
 Route 435
 Route 437
 Route 489
 Route 490
 Route 491

Prefectural symbols 
 Tree: Red pine tree (Pinus densiflora)
 Flower: Bitter summer mandarin blossom (Citrus natsudaidai)
 Bird: Hooded crane (Grus monacha)
 Fish: Tetraodontidae (Takifugu rubripes)
 Beast: Sika deer (Cervus nippon nippon)
 Mascot: Choruru

Media

Newspapers
Yamaguchi Shimbun

TV
YAB TV(ANN)
KRY TV(NNN)
TYS TV(JNN)
NHK TV
TSS TV/TNC TV (FNN)

Radio
FMY (JFN)

Notable people from Yamaguchi Prefecture 

 Shintaro Abe, former Minister of Foreign Affairs and General Secretary of the LDP. Father of Shinzo Abe
 Prime Minister Shinzō Abe represented first Yamaguchi's 1st then 4th district in the House of Representatives; his father Shintaro also represented Yamaguchi.
 Itō Hirobumi, a samurai of Chōshū domain, Japanese statesman, four-time prime minister of Japan (the 1st, 5th, 7th and 10th), genrō, and Resident-General of Korea
 Shojiro Iida, a Japanese general during World War II who led the invasions of Thailand and Burma
 Former Prime Minister Naoto Kan, born in Ube in 1946
 Yoshimasa Hayashi serves as Minister for Foreign Affairs since November 2021. Born in Shimonoseki City in Yamaguchi prefecture.
 Kasumi Ishikawa, silver medalist in Women's Team Table Tennis at the London 2012 Olympics, is from Yamaguchi City in Yamaguchi prefecture.
 Kaiketsu Masateru, sumo wrestler, who reached the second highest rank of ōzeki on two separate occasions and was chairman of the Japan Sumo Association 2010–2012
Soyu Matsuoka Roshi, an important pioneer of Soto Zen Buddhism in the United States
 Karyu, guitarist of the band D'espairsRay is from Yamaguchi. The band had a "homecoming" live there in 2007 and 2009.
 Sayumi Michishige, a Japanese idol who is one of the sixth-generation members of Japanese idol group Morning Musume, was born in Yamaguchi.
 Shinji Mikami, video game designer; the God-father of the survival horror genre of video games
 Yasunori Mitsuda, composer
 Yuki Urushibara, manga artist, creator of Mushishi
 Yoshiyuki Sadamoto, a Japanese character designer, manga artist, and one of the founding members of the Gainax anime studio
 Shaura, singer
 Kido Takayoshi, one of the two main architects of the Meiji Restoration
 Atsushi Tamura of the comic duo London Boots Ichi-go Ni-go is from Shimonoseki in Yamaguchi.
 Raizo Tanaka, a Japanese rear admiral during World War II
 Teruzane Utada, music producer, manager and father of Hikaru Utada is from Yamaguchi Prefecture, as mentioned on the latter's blog.
 Harukichi Yamaguchi, founder of the Yamaguchi-gumi, born near Kobe but his entire family hailed from Yamaguchi.
 Tadashi Yanai, Japanese businessman, founder and president of Fast Retailing, of which Uniqlo is a subsidiary
 KAIRI, professional wrestler currently signed to World Wonder Ring Stardom and former WWE employee
 Mayu Iwatani, professional wrestler currently signed to World Wonder Ring Stardom
Hideaki Anno, anime director famous for creating Neon Genesis Evangelion. His live-action film Shiki-Jitsu features scenes set in his hometown of Ube.

Sister districts
Yamaguchi Prefecture has alliance with the following five districts.

  Bình Dương Province, Vietnam (since 2014)
  Shandong Province, China (since 1982)
  South Gyeongsang Province, South Korea (since 1987)
  Pamplona, Navarre, Spain (since 1980)
  Krasnodar Krai, Russia (since 2017)

Politics
Since the Meiji Restoration in which lower-rank nobility from Chōshū played a major role, many politicians from Yamaguchi have held important positions in national politics. In the post-war era, the most prominent political family from Yamaguchi is the Kishi-Abe/Satō prime ministerial dynasty, and Yamaguchi is leaning solidly towards the Liberal Democratic Party (LDP).

Delegation to the National Diet 
Since the electoral reform of the 1990s, Yamaguchi elects four members directly to the House of Representatives. Three of the new single-member districts have been held exclusively by Liberal Democrats as of 2013, the easternmost district bordering Hiroshima was initially won by Shinji Satō (Eisaku Satō's son) in 1996, but went to Democrat Hideo Hiraoka in several later elections. Currently, following the 2021 general election, Yamaguchi's directly elected delegation to the lower house consists of former LDP vice president Masahiko Kōmura (1st district, 12th term), the chairman of the foreign affairs committee, Nobuo Kishi (2nd district, 2nd term, former two-term member of the House of Councillors), and the chairman of the House of Representatives rules committee (as of 190th Diet, January 2016), Yoshimasa Hayashi (3rd district, 1st term). The seat for the 4th district was held by former prime minister Shinzo Abe until his assassination in 2022, and is currently vacant. For the proportional representation segment of the House of Representatives, Yamaguchi forms part of the Chūgoku block.

In the House of Councillors, Yamaguchi is represented by two members, making it one of the currently 31 winner-take-all single-member districts. As of 2013, the two members are Yoshimasa Hayashi (LDP, 4th term, up in 2019), agriculture minister in the 2nd Abe Cabinet, and following the April 2013 by-election to replace Nobuo Kishi, Kiyoshi Ejima (LDP, 1st term, up in 2016), former mayor of Shimonoseki city.

Governor 
The current governor of Yamaguchi is former MIC bureaucrat Tsugumasa Muraoka. He won the gubernatorial election in February 2014 with more than 60% of the vote against other two candidates, and succeeded Shigetarō Yamamoto who had been hospitalized since October 2013 and resigned in January 2014.

Elected governors of Yamaguchi have been:
 Tatsuo Tanaka, 1947–1953 (2 terms, resigned mid-term to enter national politics), the son of pre-war prime minister Baron Giichi Tanaka
 Tarō Ozawa, 1953–1960 (2 terms, resigned mid-term to enter national politics), Tanaka's son-in-law
 Masayuki Hashimoto, 1960–1976 (4 terms), previously member of the House of Representatives from Yamaguchi for the LDP
 Tōru Hirai, 1976–1996 (5 terms), previously Home Affairs Ministry bureaucrat and vice-governor of Yamaguchi under Hashimoto
 Sekinari Nii, 1996–2012 (4 terms), previously Home Affairs Ministry bureaucrat and treasurer of Yamaguchi under Hirai
 Shigetarō Yamamoto, 2012–2014 (1 term, resigned for health reasons), former LDP candidate for the House of Representatives in Yamaguchi's 2nd district

Assembly 
The prefectural assembly of Yamaguchi has 47 members, elected in unified local elections in 15 electoral districts: 5 single-member districts, four two-member districts and six districts that elect each between four and nine members. In the 2015 election, the LDP won a majority. Liberal Democrats form several parliamentary groups together with independents. As of June 8, 2015, the assembly is composed as follows: LDP 24 members, LDP Shinseikai 5, Kōmeitō 5, DPJ/Rengō no Kai 4, LDP Kensei Club 2, JCP 2, SDP/Citizens League 2, and the independent "groups" shinsei club, mushozoku no kai and kusa no ne have one member each.

Notes

References
 Nussbaum, Louis-Frédéric and Käthe Roth. (2005). Japan Encyclopedia. Cambridge: Harvard University Press. ; .

External links

 Official Yamaguchi Prefecture homepage 

 
Chūgoku region
Prefectures of Japan